Percival "Percy" James Benbough (April 14, 1884 – November 4, 1942) was an American Republican politician  from California.

Percy Benbough was born 1884 near London, England and came to San Diego when he was four. At first he ran a grocery store and men's clothing store. After his father's death he ran and expanded his father's mortuary business.

Benbough was elected councilman and served during 1913–1917, where he was also superintendent of the fire department.  He ran for mayor in 1927 but lost.  In 1931 Benbough was appointed police chief, where he transferred people to break up cliques to help fight corruption then existing in the police department. After only three months as chief he resigned, due to frustration in removing entrenched corruption.

Benbough was elected mayor of San Diego in 1935 and reelected 1939.
Part of his accomplishments as mayor was to help prepare the city for World War II.
He died in office on November 4, 1942, the only San Diego mayor to die in office. 
Benbough is entombed at Cypress View Mausoleum.

Benbough and his wife Grace Legler Benbough had two sons. She was born December 8, 1881, and died October 12, 1961, in San Diego.
Their son Percy J., Jr. was killed in a plane crash February 20, 1932 at age 25.
They also had at least one other son, Lt. (jg) George Benbough, USNR.

The San Diego Historical Society's Percy Benbough Award for Distinction in Government Leadership honors Benbough.
The Grace Benbough Room of Sharp Mary Birch Hospital in San Diego honors his wife, and was made possible by their son's legacy, the Legler Benbough Foundation.

Quote
Don't let your money go to anyone who claims he can fix you at City Hall. We are going to get rid of the chiseler and the rat and we need your help. . . . If you insist on doing an illegal business—and mind you, I am not telling you it is all right—take your chances. . . . It will break you if you have to pay protection money and fines, too. [Speaking before the San Diego Liberal Businessman's Association, a group of saloonkeepers, bookmakers, and alike, on the eve of the 1935 California Pacific International Exposition.

See also
 Obituary, San Diego Union, November 5, 1942
 Benbough Family Collection, San Diego Historical Society archives
 The Legler Benbough Foundation

Mayors of San Diego
1884 births
1942 deaths
California Republicans
20th-century American politicians